Susan Wyber Serjeantson  (born 1946) is an Australian geneticist and professor of genetics at the John Curtin School of Medical Research at the Australian National University.

Academic career 
Born Susan Wyber in 1946 in Riverstone, New South Wales, Serjeantson was educated at Caringbah High School. She was dux and school captain in 1963.

Serjeantson completed a BSc at the University of New South Wales in 1967. In 1970 she graduated from the University of Hawaii with a PhD.

She joined the Australian National University (ANU) in 1976 as a research fellow in the John Curtin School of Medical Research. She was appointed full professor in 1988 and in 1993 became Deputy Vice-Chancellor of ANU and Director of its Institute of Advanced Studies. She resigned in 1997 and took up a visiting fellowship there. She was executive secretary of the Australian Academy of Science from 2001.

In 1994 she was interviewed by Ann Moyal and included as one of three women in Portraits In Science.

Honours and recognition 
Serjeantson was awarded the Clunies Ross Award for Science and Technology in 1992. In that year she gave Ruth Sanger oration and was made a life member of the Australian and New Zealand Society of Blood Transfusion.

In the 2000 Queen's Birthday Honours Serjeantson was made an Officer of the Order of Australia "service to science, particularly through research in the field of human genetics, and to academic administration as an advocate of scientific research in higher education".

Serjeantson was awarded the 2008 Academy Medal by the Australian Academy of Science.

Selected works

References

Further reading 

 

1946 births
Living people
University of New South Wales alumni
University of Hawaiʻi alumni
Academic staff of the Australian National University
Officers of the Order of Australia
Australian geneticists
Australian women scientists